The Open University of Kaohsiung (OUK) is an open university in Siaogang District, Kaohsiung, Taiwan. OUK is an agency of the Kaohsiung City Government.

As a comprehensive university, OUK offers academic programs at the undergraduate and graduate levels, including business, tourism, engineering, technology, marine science, and design. 

OUK also offers flexible and innovative learning options through its distance education and continuing education programs.

History 
The OUK was originally established in 1997 as the Opening University of Kaohsiung. In 2008, it was renamed to Open University of Kaohsiung.

Faculties
 Department of Law
 Department of Industrial and Business Administration
 Department of Mass Communication
 Department of Foreign Languages and Literature
 Department of Culture and Art
 Department of Technology Management
 General Education Center

See also
 List of universities in Taiwan

References

External links

 Open University of Kaohsiung

1997 establishments in Taiwan
Educational institutions established in 1997
Universities and colleges in Kaohsiung
Universities and colleges in Taiwan